Vatica compressa is a tree in the family Dipterocarpaceae, native to Borneo. The specific epithet compressa means "compressed", referring to the twig when young.

Description
The inflorescences bear cream flowers.

Distribution and habitat
Vatica compressa is endemic to Borneo, where it is confined to Sarawak.

Conservation
Vatica compressa has been assessed as vulnerable on the IUCN Red List. It is threatened by habitat loss and logging for its timber.

References

compressa
Endemic flora of Borneo
Flora of Sarawak
Plants described in 1967